Nerrukku Ner is a 1997 Indian Tamil-language action thriller film written and directed by Vasanth and produced by Mani Ratnam. The film stars Vijay, Suriya, Simran, and Kausalya, while Raghuvaran, Shanthi Krishna, Baby Jennifer, Karan, Vivek, Manivannan, and Prakash Raj played the supporting roles. It is the first film for Suriya, the eldest son of actor Sivakumar. Deva and K. V. Anand handled the film's soundtrack and cinematography respectively.

Nerrukku Ner released on 6 September 1997. The film received positive reviews and was a commercial success.

Plot
The story starts off with Raghu, a passport-issuing officer, and his wife Shanthi, who live in Chennai. Raghu, being an honest man, tells Shanthi that he cheated on her with a coworker when he was in Goa. She immediately leaves for her mother's house. Raghu, being a transformed gentleman, tries to stop her by apologizing, but in vain. Raghu's brother Vijay, being a good and supportive brother, and Shanthi's brother Suriya, being a non-emotive but supporting brother, meet in a cinema theater. Vijay blames Shanthi to be the cause of the problem, and Suriya blames Raghu for the same. They keep on fighting at every chance. Meanwhile, both Vijay and Suriya find their own lovers in Akhila and Asha respectively and fall in love.

One day, Raghu finds a bundle of cash on his table and meets Muthukumaraswamy, the person who kept the money there. Raghu finds out that Muthukumaraswamy is a businessman who is wanted by the police for the crime of forex fraud. Muthukumaraswamy wants to leave the country to escape from the police, and he needs a fake passport to flee the country; otherwise, the police will catch him. Since his passport is confiscated by the police, he tells Raghu to get one for him, but Raghu, being a sincere officer, disagrees and calls the police instead. Muthukumaraswamy gets angry and promises to take revenge on Raghu. Meanwhile, Raghu and Shanthi apply for a divorce according to the Hindu Law of Divorce. Child custody of their daughter Sona, who was in Shanthi's sister's house when the breakup occurred, is given to the mother by the court. One day, Suriya takes Sona to a festival fair and somehow loses her. In the confusion that follows, Sona falls from a Ferris wheel and is taken to the hospital by Vijay. She is brought to Raghu's house once she recovers. Soon, Vijay discovers that Sona has lost her hearing in the accident. Some days later, Suriya finds that Sona is missing. Suriya finds Vijay, and the two get into a huge fight. Then, Raghu tells everyone that Sona is in his sister's house. Since Sona's custody is given to the mother, this action of Raghu's is wrong in the eyes of the law.

Shanthi and Suriya, accompanied by a lawyer, come to Raghu's house to get Sona back. At that time, Raghu suffers a serious asthma attack while in the bathroom, and everyone saves him. After recovering, Raghu tells everyone that Sona is not in his sister's house but has been kidnapped by Muthukumaraswamy, who is out on bail. In a turn of events, Raghu issues a fake passport to Muthukumaraswamy, but Raghu does not want him to escape from the police. The two heroes join hands to make sure that this does not happen. Sona is with Muthukumaraswamy's wife and brother-in-law Kachiram in a van. Vijay and Suriya both search for Sona, then find out that she is in a van. Sona, after seeing both Vijay and Suriya on a bike, throws her family photo from the van. Meanwhile, the van reaches the safe place, and Kachiram calls Muthukumaraswamy to share the news of their arrival. They both decide to insert a bomb in Sona's hearing device. Muthukumaraswamy's wife then decides to save the child. Her brother Kachiram fights her and puts her in the van and activates the bomb which will explode in 10 mins. Then, Vijay and Suriya catch the van, and a fight between Kachiram and Vijay ensues. Meanwhile, Suriya takes Sona home along with her hearing device which still has the bomb. In the middle of the fight, Kachiram drives away in a car. Muthukumaraswamy's wife shouts to Vijay to save Sona by telling him about the bomb. At the airport, Kanthaswamy, the Chennai Deputy Commissioner of Police, arrests Muthukumaraswamy. As Suriya reaches home, Vijay follows them. Once Vijay reaches home, he throws away Sona's hearing device before the bomb goes off. The film ends Vijay and Suriya becoming best friends again after a long time and reconciling with their lady loves, and Raghu and Shanthi also embrace each other with Sona.

Cast

Production
Initially, Vasanth roped in his lead hero from Aasai, Ajith Kumar and Vijay to play the lead roles, though Ajith withdrew from the film 18 days after production began as a result of issues with director Vasanth on not revealing the story to the actor as it involves dual hero subject. The film was briefly reported to be titled Manasukkul Varalaama? (Can I Come into your Heart?) and also featured Swathi in the cast. Prabhu Deva was touted as a potential replacement to Ajith, though Vasanth then opted to replace Ajith with a debutant as he was able to commit under short notice. Vasanth then approached Suriya, son of veteran actor Sivakumar, to make his acting debut in the film. Vasanth had earlier unsuccessfully tried to persuade Suriya to star in his previous film, Aasai, in 1995 but the actor's father insisted that Suriya was finally ready to act. During the test shoot for the film, cinematographer K. V. Anand revealed that the team were worried how Suriya was going to stand opposite Vijay and that they made him wear two inch heels and made him put some shoulder pads. He added that for the first four days during the shoot in Kolkata, Suriya appeared to be uncomfortable in front of the camera and used to tell the team that he didn't want to do the film.

The film was the first Tamil project signed by Simran who was signed by Vasanth after he was impressed with her looks in Tere Mere Sapne, though Once More and VIP released earlier. Vasanth signed on Kausalya after seeing and being impressed with her picture at a jewellery shop and was unaware that she had already made her debut in the hit film Kaalamellam Kadhal Vaazhga.

The director revealed he had great difficulty in filming the song "Engengae", as crowds in Kolkata refused to co-operate with the technical team. The filming mainly took place in and around Trivandrum and Kochi, with some minority portions being shot in Chennai.

Reception
The film released on 6 September 1997 and received positive reviews from critics. Ganesh Ramachandran, reviewer from Indolink praised the director for non-violent theme and applauding Raghuvaran, Vivek and Manivannan's acting, which provide comedy relief. The music director Deva was appreciated for his "haunting numbers". On the other hand, the picturisation of the songs were criticized heavily. Karan Bali, writing for Upperstall, applauded the technical aspect of the film, K. V. Anand's cinematography, the script and Deva's music. Performance wise, Raghuvaran and Shanthi Krishna were said to be "reliably efficient as the brother and sister of Vijay and Suriya respectively", while the critic labelled the performance of Suriya as a "terribly awkward debut". The song "Manam Virumbuthey" was described as the best song in the film for its picturisation and choreography.

The film went on to win two Tamil Nadu State Film Awards for 1997 with the child artiste, Jennifer, securing the Best Child Star award for her performance. Harini also won the Best Female Playback Singer award for her rendition of "Manam Virumbuthae" in the album aged just 18.

Soundtrack

The soundtrack consists of 6 songs, composed by Deva. The song "Akila Akila" is based on Bob Marley's "Buffalo Soldier".

References

External links
 

1997 films
Films shot in Kolkata
Films shot in Chennai
Films shot in Madurai
Films shot in Kochi
Films shot in Thiruvananthapuram
Films scored by Deva (composer)
Films directed by Vasanth
1990s Tamil-language films
Indian action thriller films
1997 action thriller films